Joseph Ellis, Sr. (1666-1752) was a colonial American politician. He served as selectman, moderator, and representative to the Great and General Court where he served seven terms.

Ellis was a resident of the Clapboardtrees section of town, which is today Westwood. He election to the General Court was opposed by those in the central village, and they filed a petition to prevent him from taking his seat 1727. He was seated anyway.

He was born in Dedham in 1666 and died there in 1752. He was a selectman in 1714, 1715, and 1717. In 1725, 1726, 1728, and 1731 he was elected moderator.

He married Dorothy Spaulding in 1690 and Sarah Hemenway in 1703. He had 8 children, including Joseph Ellis Jr.

References

Works cited

Members of the colonial Massachusetts General Court from Dedham
1666 births
1752 deaths
Dedham, Massachusetts selectmen